The 41st Missouri Infantry Regiment was an infantry regiment that served in the Union Army during the American Civil War.

Service
The 41st Missouri Infantry Regiment was organized at Benton Barracks August through September 1864 and mustered in September 16, 1864 for one year service under the command of Colonel Joseph Weydemeyer. The regiment served garrison duty at St. Louis, Missouri, until July 1865.

The 41st Missouri Infantry mustered out July 11, 1865.

Casualties
The regiment lost a total of 37 men during service; 1 enlisted man killed, 2 officers and 34 enlisted men died of disease.

Commanders
 Colonel Joseph Weydemeyer

See also

 Missouri Civil War Union units
 Missouri in the Civil War

References
 Dyer, Frederick H. A Compendium of the War of the Rebellion (Des Moines, IA: Dyer Pub. Co.), 1908.
Attribution
 

Military units and formations established in 1864
Military units and formations disestablished in 1865
Units and formations of the Union Army from Missouri
1864 establishments in Missouri
1865 disestablishments in Missouri